Illinois Route 93 (IL 93) is a  east–west state route in central Illinois. It runs from Illinois Route 91, one mile (1.6 km) west of Elmira to Illinois Route 40, one mile (1.6 km) west of Bradford.

Route description
IL 93 is a rural, two-lane undivided surface road for its entire length. It begins at IL 91 just west of Elmira. It travels east and curves north slightly, passing through southern Elmira. Route 93 continues west through slight hills for the majority of its length, passing only township and county roads. After a curve south, it ends at an intersection with IL 40 west of Bradford.

History
SBI Route 93 originally ran from Galva to Bradford, with a southern spur to Toulon. In the early 1930s, U.S. Route 34 replaced Illinois 93 from west of Galva to west of Elmira. In 1936, Illinois Route 91 replaced the remaining segment west of Elmira to the spur, and then south to Toulon.

Junction list

References

093
Transportation in Stark County, Illinois
U.S. Route 34